The American hip hop group Black Eyed Peas has released nine studio albums, two compilation albums, one extended play, forty singles, eight promotional singles, thirty-eight music videos, and two video albums. Interscope Records released the band's debut album, Behind the Front, in the United States in June 1998. Although the album received a four-star review from AllMusic, it charted low on the Billboard 200 in the United States and on the French Albums Chart, at numbers 129 and 149 respectively. The band's second album, Bridging the Gap, was released in 2000 and peaked at number sixty-seven in the US and reached its highest position in New Zealand, at number eighteen.

In June 2003, the band released its third album, Elephunk, which included the singles "Where Is the Love?", the band's first international number-one single, "Shut Up", "Hey Mama", and "Let's Get It Started". The album peaked at number fourteen in the US and was certified two times platinum by the Recording Industry Association of America. It peaked at number one on the Australian Albums Chart; number two on the Canadian Albums Chart, French and New Zealand Albums Chart; and number three in the UK Albums Chart. Their fourth album, entitled Monkey Business, was released in 2005 and reached number two in the US and number one in many countries. It spawned their two highest-charting singles on the Billboard Hot 100 at the time, "Don't Phunk with My Heart" and "My Humps", both of which reached number three.

The Black Eyed Peas released their fifth studio album, The E.N.D, in June 2009. It became their highest charting album in the US, reaching number one. The first single from the album, "Boom Boom Pow", peaked at number one on the Billboard Hot 100, making it the band's first US number-one hit, and held onto the top spot for twelve weeks until the album's second single, "I Gotta Feeling", replaced it. "I Gotta Feeling" also replaced "Boom Boom Pow" at the top of the charts in Canada and Australia and peaked at number one in numerous other countries, including the United Kingdom. The album's third single, "Meet Me Halfway", has peaked at number one in Australia, Germany and the UK and reached the top ten in the US. The fourth single, "Imma Be", became the group's third number-one single on the Billboard Hot 100.

The Black Eyed Peas released their sixth studio album, The Beginning, in November 2010. The first single from the album, "The Time (Dirty Bit)", reached number 1 on the UK Singles Chart on December 12. The second single was "Just Can't Get Enough", and it was released in February 2011. The album's third single was "Don't Stop the Party", and it was released in May 2011. In 2015, they celebrated their 20th anniversary and released the songs "Awesome" and "Yesterday". Today, the group has sold approximately 35 million albums and 120 million singles worldwide. Following Fergie's departure from the band in 2016, they released the albums: Masters of the Sun Vol. 1 in 2018, Translation in 2020, and Elevation in November 2022.

Albums

Studio albums

Compilation albums

Extended plays

Singles

As lead artist

As featured artist

Promotional singles

Other charted songs

Video albums

Music videos

As lead artist

Other appearances

See also
 Fergie discography
 will.i.am discography

Notes

References 
General

 
 
 

Specific

External links
 Black Eyed Peas official website

Discography
Discographies of American artists
Hip hop discographies
Pop music group discographies